José Antonio González Cobacho (born 15 June 1979) is a Spanish racewalker. He competed in the men's 50 kilometres walk at the 2004 Summer Olympics.

Notes

References

External links
 
 

1979 births
Living people
Spanish male racewalkers
Olympic athletes of Spain
Athletes (track and field) at the 2004 Summer Olympics
People from Igualada
Sportspeople from the Province of Barcelona